Pono may refer to:

People
  (born 1976), Polish rapper; see Polish hip hop
 Pono Haitsuka (born 1991), American rugby player
 Soyisile Pono (born 1994), South African cricket player

Places
 Pono River, Indonesia

Other
 Pono (digital music service)
 Pono (word)
 PonoPlayer